Windfall or Windfalls may refer to:

Arts and media

Film and television
 Windfall (1935 film), adaptation of R. C. Sherriff's 1933 play,  directed by Frederick Hayward and George King 
 Windfall (1955 film), a British comedy film by John Gilling and directed by Henry Cass
 Windfall, a 2003 film directed by Gerry Lively
 Windfall (2010 film), documentary on wind power directed by Laura Israel
 Windfall (2022 film), an American thriller film starring Jason Segel, Lily Collins, and Jesse Plemons
 Windfall (TV series), a drama about the recipients of a huge lottery win
 Windfall Films, a UK production company of documentaries, now part of the Argonon group
 Windfalls, an English animated television series created, written, and directed by Jenny Kenna

Music
 Windfall (Rick Nelson album)
 Windfall (Joe Pug album)
 "Windfall", a song  by Dead Can Dance from the album Within the Realm of a Dying Sun
 "Windfall", a song by Son Volt from the album Trace
 Windfall Records
 "Windfall", a composition by Netty Simons
 "Windfall", a composition by TheFatRat

Other arts
 Windfall (novel), by Desmond Bagley
 Windfall, a 1933 play by R. C. Sherriff
 Windfall (sculpture), an abstract artwork by Robert Murray
 Windfall: The Oil Crisis Game, a business simulation game for the Apple II
 Windfall Island, a location in the video game The Legend of Zelda: The Wind Waker

Places
 Windfall, Alberta, Canada, a locality
 Windfall, Indiana, United States, a town

Other uses
 Windfall gain, the unexpected receipt of something of high value
 Windfall II, a racehorse